The Leffler-MacFarlane LM-1 is an American mid-wing, single-seat, FAI Open Class glider that was designed and constructed by Al Leffler, Walt MacFarlane and Bill Meyer, first flying in November 1963.

Design and development
The LM-1 was built using a modified wing from a Laister-Kauffman TG-4. The wing retains its original wood and doped aircraft fabric construction, its  span as well as the use of a NACA 4418 airfoil at the wing root, transitioning to a NACA 4409 at the wing tip. The newly designed fuselage is made from welded steel tube and fiberglass. The landing gear was originally a retractable dual-wheel hydraulic arrangement, that was replaced with a more conventional retractable monowheel from a Schreder HP-14.

The aircraft was registered with the US Federal Aviation Administration in the Experimental - Amateur-built category. Only one was ever constructed.

In 1974 it was reported that plans were underway to create a new  span wing for the LM-1, that would feature a Wortmann airfoil.

Operational history
By 1974 the LM-1 had flown  of cross country distance. In August 2011, 48 years after its first flight, the aircraft was still registered with the FAA and was owned by Bill Meyers, one of the original partners.

Specifications (LM-1)

See also

References

1960s United States sailplanes
Homebuilt aircraft
Aircraft first flown in 1963